Meet Bhavsar (born 23 June 2004) is a cricketer who plays for the Kuwait national cricket team. He was born and raised in Kuwait to Indian parents.

Bhavsar made his Twenty20 International (T20I) debut for Kuwait against the Maldives on 20 January 2019 in the 2019 ACC Western Region T20 tournament. At the age of 14 years and 211 days, he became the youngest to play in a men's T20I match. In July 2019, he was named in Kuwait's squad for the Regional Finals of the 2018–19 ICC T20 World Cup Asia Qualifier tournament. He played in Kuwait's match against Qatar on 26 July 2019, which Kuwait won by 10 runs. In October 2021, he was named in Kuwait's squad for the Group A matches in the 2021 ICC Men's T20 World Cup Asia Qualifier.

In December 2021, Bhavsar scored 175 not out from 149 balls, out of a team total of 241, to lead the Kuwait under-19s to a one-wicket victory over Nepal in the 2021 ACC Under-19 Asia Cup.

References

External links
 

2004 births
Living people
Kuwaiti cricketers
Kuwait Twenty20 International cricketers
Indian expatriates in Kuwait
Place of birth missing (living people)